Christina Smith may refer to:

Christina Smith (bobsleigh) (born 1968), Canadian Olympic bobsledder
Christina Smith (missionary) (1809–1893), Australian settler, teacher and lay missionary
Christina Smith (model) (born 1957), American model and Playboy Playmate of the Month
Christina Smith (make-up artist) (born 1945), American make-up artist
Christina Gokey-Smith (born 1973), American cyclist

See also
Christine Smith (disambiguation)
Chris Smith (disambiguation)
Christopher Smith (disambiguation)
Christian Smith (disambiguation)